Forever Miles Davis is a three-disc compilation album by American jazz musician Miles Davis, released in 1981 by independent label Madacy Special Markets.

Track listing

Disc 1
 "My Funny Valentine" (Hart, Rodgers) – 6:04
 "Blues by Five" (Garland) – 10:23
 "Airegin" (Rollins) – 4:26
 "Tune-Up/When Lights Are Low" (Carter, Davis, Williams) – 13:09

Disc 2
 "If I Were a Bell" (Loesser) – 8:18
 "You're My Everything" (Dixon, Warren, Young) – 5:19
 "I Could Write a Book" (Hart, Rodgers) – 5:10
 "Oleo" (Rollins) – 6:20
 "It Could Happen to You" (Burke, VanHeusen) – 6:39
 "Woody'n You" (Gillespie) – 5:02

Disc 3
 "It Never Entered My Mind" (Hart, Rodgers) – 5:26
 "Four" (Davis) – 7:15
 "In Your Own Sweet Way" (Brubeck) – 5:45
 "The Theme [Take 1]" (Davis) – 2:01
 "Trane's Blues" (Coltrane) – 8:35
 "Ahmad's Blues" (Jamal) – 7:27
 "Half Nelson" (Davis) – 4:47
 "The Theme [Take 2]" (Davis) – 1:04

Personnel
 Rikka Arnold – project assistant
 Dave Brubeck – composing
 Johnny Burke – composer
 Emmanuel Campeau – cover design
 Chris Clough – project assistant
 John Coltrane – composing, tenor saxophone
 Miles Davis – composer, trumpet
 Esmond Edwards – cover design
 Zev Feldman – project assistant
 Red Garland – composer, piano
 Dizzy Gillespie – composer
 Ira Gitler – liner notes
 Joe Goldberg – liner notes
 Lorenz Hart – composer
 Jimmy Van Heusen – composer
 Terri Hinte – project assistant
 Ahmad Jamal – composer
 Philly Joe Jones – drums
 Stuart Kremsky – reissue production assistant
 Frank Loesser – composer
 Jack Maher – liner notes
 Reid Miles – cover design
 Cheryl Pawelski – project assistant
 Nick Phillips – reissues producer, reissues supervisor
 Richard Rodgers – composer
 Sonny Rollins – composer
 David Roy – liner notes
 Rudy Van Gelder – author, engineering, remastering
 Bob Weinstock – supervisor

Charting history

References

External links
 

2007 compilation albums
Miles Davis compilation albums
Albums recorded at CBS 30th Street Studio